The 2014 Jinggu earthquake occurred on October 7, 2014 at 21:49 (UTC+8).

Details 
The epicenter was located in Jinggu, Pu'er, Yunnan, People's Republic of China. The earthquake killed at least 1 person and injured at least 324 others. The magnitude of the earthquake was placed at  6.6 by the China Earthquake Data Center with a focal depth of 5.0 kilometres (12 mi). It was measured at  6.0 by the United States Geological Survey with a focal depth of 10.9 kilometres (6.7 mi)  and  6.1 by the European Alert System.

Effects and relief efforts
As of October 9, 2014, Jinggu had centralized resettlement of 37,000 people, received 13,000 tents and 2,300 quilts. The earthquake damaged 7 reservoirs to varying degrees: the largest Changhai reservoir sprouted bad leaks. High voltage power lines were repaired, tap water supply returned to normal, and village roads were opening.

See also

List of earthquakes in 2014
List of earthquakes in China

References

External links

earthquakes
China
Earthquakes in Yunnan
Geography of Pu'er